Stringtown is the name of several unincorporated communities in Indiana:
Stringtown, Boone County, Indiana
Stringtown, Fountain County, Indiana 
Stringtown, Hancock County, Indiana
Stringtown, Miami County, Indiana
Stringtown, Ripley County, Indiana
Stringtown, Sullivan County, Indiana
Stringtown, Vanderburgh County, Indiana